Hibiscus scottii is a species of flowering plant in the family Malvaceae. It is found only in Yemen. Its natural habitat is subtropical or tropical dry forests.

References

scottii
Endemic flora of Socotra
Vulnerable plants
Taxonomy articles created by Polbot
Taxa named by Isaac Bayley Balfour